The 1994 Czech Lion Awards ceremony was held on 3 March 1995.

Winners and nominees

Non-statutory Awards

References

1994 film awards
Czech Lion Awards ceremonies